The Northeast Senior Eagles are a senior ice hockey team based in Torbay, Newfoundland and Labrador as part of the New East Coast Senior Hockey League. They have been a member of the Avalon East Senior Hockey league since its inception in 1967. They currently play out of the Jack Byrne Arena in Torbay, Newfoundland. Their home games are Friday nights at 8:00pm.

History

2015–16
The 2015–16 version of the Northeast Eagles will looks a little different than the one that lost to the Southern Shore in game 7 to end the 2015 season. The Eagles lost 14 players following last season. Their biggest losses are the league's leading scorer and third-leading scorer as both Reid brothers, Kevin and Mason, are heading to join the Clarenville Caribous of the Provincial Senior League. The addition of the Conception Bay Ceebees saw the Eagles lose netminder Bronson Dawe, forward Dan Sparkes, and the rights to Tommy Snow and rearguard Fred Earle. Kory Waterman was traded to the Bell Island Blues in exchange for a 3rd pick in the first draft this season. Also not returning are Brock Hopkins, Mitch Flynn, Matthew Horan, Matthew Oates, Matthew Power, Brad Sheppard, and Brad Yetman. Yetman will join assistant Darryl Banfield as the new head coach of the Eagles.

There will be some new faces joining the Eagles this season. The Eagles made a trade with the Bell Island Blues for the 3rd overall pick in the October draft and used it to select former Ceebee Chris Sparkes. Sparkes made a living in the goalmouth as a member of the Ceebees and most recently the Grand Falls Cataracts, and will be expected to help fill the void of Mason Reid. Local defensive stalwart Jeremy Kavanagh has left the Clarenville Caribous to join the Eagles. Kavanagh is a former Herder champ with the Bous and is known to be one of the best defensive defenseman in Newfoundland. Former St. Mary's grad and Halifax Moosehead Andrew White has also decided to leave the Gander Flyers of the provincial league to join the Eagles. White, a gifted sniper, will add some scoring punch to a team losing two of its top three scorers from last year. Also returning to the Avalon East league is former St. John's Maple leaf and Belleville Bull, Mark Chaplin. Chaplin a veteran leader in senior hockey has won several herders and has a knack to score big goals in big games. Former St. John's Fog Devil Chris Thorne is also returning to the Eagles after a one-year hiatus. Thorne, a big two way center will also add some offense and leadership. Former Clarenville Caribou Mitch Bragg was also obtained via a trade with the Bell Island Blues. Bragg will also provide some offense to an already well balanced group of forwards. Hard nosed power forward Tyler Walshe will also be back this year after moving to Alberta for a year. Walsh a fan favorite at the Jack Byrne, causes nightmares for opposing defenseman. Replacing goaltender Bronson Dawe is former Jr. Celtic Billy Dawe. Also graduating from Jr. are defenseman Matt Walsh and forward Chris Blackwood. Walsh logged heavy minutes for the Jr. Celtics, and Blackwood wreaked havoc on Jr. goaltenders scoring 28 goals in the 2013-14 season. Also returning after a two-year break is defenseman Cory Sturge and forward Shawn Roberts. ** Sean Wadden joined the Eagles after xmas after leaving the Gander Flyers. Wadden, a high scoring winger will bolster the Eagles offence in the second half of the season. Goalie Matthew Power also rejoined the Eagles after xmas after taking last year off.

Chris Sparkes was the league's top scorer, netting 22 goals and adding 26 assists for 48 points. 

The Eagles swept the Bell Island Blues in round one of the playoffs, surrendering 8 goals in the four-game sweep. 

The St. John's Caps won their 4th crown in five years with a 4-2 game 7 victory in front of a standing room-only crowd at the Jack Byrne Arena. Kyle Downer was again the difference as he picked up his 4th playoff MVP trophy in the Caps run to the cup. The St. John's Caps, for the first time in 10 years, now represent the AESHL as they take on the CWSHL winner the Grand Falls Cataracts in a best-of-five affair for the Herder Memorial Trophy.

2014–15
The 2014–15 version of the Northeast Eagles looked a little different from last year's team. After losing to the St. John's Capitals for the third straight year, head coach Darryl Banfield made some acquisitions at the AESHL draft in hopes of bringing an East League title to Torbay. New Faces to the 2014 squad are Kevin Reid, Chris Mooney, Daniel Sparkes, Mark Yetman, Brad Yetman, Mitch Flynn, Mike Halitzki, Kory Waterman, Jason Picco, Lee Newhook, and Fred Earle.

Kevin Reid last toiled with the Conception Bay Ceebees in the now defunct Newfoundland Provincial Hockey League. Reid has started the season strong and is a sparkplug in the Eagles offense. After leading the Mount Pearl Blades in scoring, sniper Chris Mooney returns to the Eagles. Cagey veteran Daniel Sparkes has added some toughness to the Eagles squad as well as he joins the Eagles after a long career with the Ceebees. Former Gander Flyer, and hard nosed defenseman Mitch Flynn has decided to try his hand at hockey in the East league as well. Mark Yetman, a herder winner with the CeeBees and Cataracts is known as one of the top goalies in Newfoundland. Joining last years top netminder, Bronson Dawe, the Eagles have the best one-two goalie tandem in the league. Brad Yetman, a QMJHL graduate, and former Ceebee, helps anchor a defensive core led by last years AESHL League leading scorer, Dan Cadigan. Also returning to the Eagles after a one-year hiatus is high flying centerman, Mike Halitzki. Obtained in a trade from Bell Island, two time herder champ and Rock Rugby star Jason Picco joins the Eagles team. The Eagles hope the hard nosed defensan can add toughness and leadership. Lee Newhook, a graduate of the Whitbourne minor hockey system adds speed and grit up front for the Eagles. Fred Earle was also obtained in a trade with the St. John's Capitals in exchange for Brad Slaney. Earle is now playing for the Clarenville Caribous of the newly formed Central West Senior Hockey League, however the Eagles are hoping he may join them after xmas. Jr. Celtic grad Kory Waterman also look to provide some grit to the Eagles.

Not returning to the Eagles this season are Tyler Parsons, Tyler Walshe, Jordan Mcentegart, Matthew Roche, Chris Thorne, Graham Jackman, and Evan Greene.

The Eagles finished the season in 2nd place in the Avalon East Hockey League standings with a 13-7-1 record. Mason Reid was the AESHL's leading scorer with 19g, 26a for 45 pts. He walked away this season with the Kevin Butt Memorial Award as the League's MVP. His line mate Chris Mooney was second in scoring with 43 pts, and led the league with 21 goals. Mooney was the recipient of the Frank Martin Memorial Award for the league's Most Gentlemanly and Effective player. Reid's brother Kevin finished 3rd in league scoring with 36 pts and took home the Peter Picco Memorial Award for Rookie of the Year. The trio was no doubt the league's top line giving goalies nightmares all year. Daniel Cadigan led all AESHL defenseman with 19 pts and was again awarded the Wade Duggan Memorial Award as the League's Top Defenceman.

The Eagles swept the three-time defending champion St. John's Capitals in the first round of the playoffs, only surrendering 6 goals in the 3 games.

The Eagles were bested by the Southern Shore Breakers in a seven-game final. It's the fourth year in a row that the Eagles came up short in the AESHL finals.

2013–2014
The 2013–14 team finished the regular season in the Avalon East League with a record of 18–2. After sweeping the Southern Shore Breakers in round one in 4 games, they were defeated by the now three-time defending champs, the St. John's Capitals, in a six-game series.

Dan Cadigan led the league in scoring with 41 points. Rookie Tyler Parsons was runner-up to Cadigan with 32 points, and goaltender Bronson Dawe went undefeated in the regular season.

Seasons and records

Season by season results

Note: GP = Games played, W = Wins, L = Losses, T = Ties, OTL = Overtime Losses, Pts = Points, GF = Goals for, GA = Goals against, DNQ = Did not qualifyAESHL = Avalon East Senior Hockey League, NSHL = Newfoundland Senior Hockey League''

See also
 Avalon East League Standings
 Avalon East League Statistics
 Avalon East League Schedule
List of ice hockey teams in Newfoundland and Labrador

External links 
Avalon East League Website

Ice hockey teams in Newfoundland and Labrador
Senior ice hockey teams